Charles Edward Sigismund Rucker  (4 September 1894 – 24 November 1965) was an English first-class cricketer and British Army officer.

Rucker was born at Chislehurst in September 1894. He was educated at Charterhouse School, before going up to University College, Oxford. While studying at Oxford, Rucker made five appearances in first-class cricket for Oxford University in 1914. A right-arm fast bowler, he took 13 wickets at an average of 22.23, with two five wicket hauls and best figures of 6 for 69. With the bat, he scored 66 runs with a high score of 26 not out.

His studies at Oxford were interrupted by the First World War, with Rucker being commissioned in the British Army in October 1916 as a second lieutenant. He was a temporary lieutenant in the Rifle Brigade by October 1915, He was decorated with the Military Cross in January 1916, for conspicuous gallantry on the night of the 15–16 December 1915 at Cordonnerie when he led a bombing party to destroy a German listening post while under heavy fire. He relinquished his commission in January 1918 on account of ill health, having lost a leg in action.

Following the end of the war, Rucker returned to study at Oxford, though played no further first-class cricket due to the loss of his leg. He served as the secretary of Oxford University Cricket Club in 1919. Rucker died at Blandford Forum in November 1965. His brother, Patrick, also played first-class cricket for Oxford and was killed during the Second World War, while another brother, Robin, was killed during the First World War in service with the Royal Air Force.

References

External links

1894 births
1965 deaths
Military personnel from Kent
People from Chislehurst
People educated at Charterhouse School
Alumni of University College, Oxford
English cricketers
Oxford University cricketers
British Army personnel of World War I
Rifle Brigade officers
Recipients of the Military Cross
English amputees
English disabled sportspeople